Pardomima margarodes is a moth in the family Crambidae. It was described by Edward L. Martin in 1955. It is found in Nigeria.

References

Moths described in 1955
Spilomelinae